Robert Roy Marlette (born December 7, 1955) is an American record producer, recording engineer, mixer, and songwriter. His production, writing and mixing credits include David Lee Roth, Ozzy Osbourne, Alice Cooper, Rob Zombie, Sebastian Bach, Rob Halford, Lynyrd Skynyrd, Seether, Atreyu, and Ill Niño.

Career 
Marlette started out as a session musician and the first album he appeared on was Al Stewart's 24 Carrots. He has then worked as a musician, mainly as keyboarder and pianist, and composer for numerous artists including Tracy Chapman, John Wetton, Laura Branigan, Alice Cooper, Krokus and The Storm.

In 1994 he produced Red Square Black's Square EP, his first collaboration with John 5, which would be followed by David Lee Roth's album DLR Band, 2wo (industrial metal project of John 5 and Rob Halford), the mixing of the UK bonus CD of Marilyn Manson's The Last Tour on Earth and Loser. In the late 1990s besides Rob Halford he started producing other big hard rock names like Black Sabbath and Tony Iommi, and Quiet Riot.

In the new millennium he became famous for producing hit-records for post-grunge and alternative metal bands as well as traditional hard rock bands. In 2011, he produced heavy metal band Anvil's new album Juggernaut of Justice, their first album after the documentary Anvil! The Story of Anvil. He is a regular at Monnow Valley Studio in Rockfield, Monmouthshire.

Selected discography 

ÆGES – Weightless (2016)
Airbourne – Breakin' Outta Hell (2016)
Airbourne – Runnin' Wild (2007)
Alice Cooper – Brutal Planet (2000)
Alice Cooper – Dragontown (2002)
Andy Fraser – Fine, Fine Line (1984)
Ankla – Steep Trails (2006)
Anvil – Juggernaut of Justice (2011)
Anvil – Hope In Hell (2013)
Atreyu – Congregation of the Damned (2009)
Black Sabbath – Reunion (1998)
Black Stone Cherry – Folklore and Superstition (2008)
Black Stone Cherry – Kentucky (2016)
Bleeker Ridge – Small Town Dead (2010)
Dee Carstensen – Beloved One (1993)
Filter – The Sun Comes Out Tonight (2013)
Filter – The Trouble with Angels (2010)
He is Legend – Heavyfruit (2014)
Ill Niño – Confession (2003)
Laura Branigan – Touch (1987)
Lynyrd Skynyrd – God & Guns (2009)
Lynyrd Skynyrd – Last of a Dyin' Breed (2012)
Marilyn Manson – The Last Tour on Earth (1999)
Marshall Crenshaw – Good Evening (1989)
Quiet Riot – Alive and Well (1999)
Red Sun Rising – Polyester Zeal (2015)
Rick Springfield, Tim Pierce & Bob Marlette – Sahara Snow (1997)
Rob Halford – The Essential Halford (2015)
Rob Zombie – Essential (2014)
Rob Zombie – Spookshow International Live (2015)
Rob Zombie – Venomous Rat Regeneration Vendor (2013)
Saliva – Back into Your System (2002)
Saliva – Blood Stained Love Story (2007)
Saliva – Every Six Seconds (2001)
Sebastian Bach – Abachalypse Now (2013)
Sebastian Bach – Give Em' Hell (2014)
Sebastian Bach – Kicking & Screaming (2011)
Seether – Disclaimer II (2004)
Seether – Karma and Effect (2005)
Seether – Seether: 2002–2013 (2013)
Shinedown – Leave A Whisper (2003)
Smashing Satellites – Sonicaluzion (2015)
Texas Hippie Coalition – Ride On (2014)
Tonight Alive – Limitless (2016)
Tony Iommi – Iommi (2000)
Tony Iommi/Glenn Hughes – Fused (2005)
Tracy Chapman – Crossroads (1989)
Tracy Chapman – Tracy Chapman (1988)
Union – The Blue Room (2000)
Wilson Phillips – Shadows and Light (1992)
2wo – Voyeurs (1998)

References

External links 
Bob Marlette @ Advanced Alternative Media
Bob Marlette Discography @ Discogs
Bob Marlette Discography @ Allmusic

1955 births
Living people
Record producers from Nebraska
American audio engineers